The 2011 Qatar Ladies Open was a professional women's tennis tournament played on hard courts. It was the ninth edition of the tournament and the first since 2008 which was part of the 2011 WTA Tour. It took place in Doha, Qatar between 21 and 26 February 2011.

Finals

Singles

 Vera Zvonareva defeated  Caroline Wozniacki, 6–4, 6–4
It was Zvonareva's 1st title of the year and 11th of her career. It was her 1st career Premier event title.

Doubles

 Květa Peschke /  Katarina Srebotnik defeated  Liezel Huber /  Nadia Petrova, 7–5, 6–7(2–7), [10–8]

WTA entrants

Seeds

 Rankings are as of February 14, 2011.

Other entrants
The following players received wildcards into the singles main draw:
  Fatma Al-Nabhani
  Sania Mirza

The following players received entry from the qualifying draw:

  Vera Dushevina
  Jarmila Groth
  Bojana Jovanovski
  Peng Shuai

The following player received entry as a lucky loser into the singles main draw:
  Timea Bacsinszky
  Klára Zakopalová

External links
Official Website
WTA official site

2011 WTA Tour
2011 Qatar Ladies Open
2011 in Qatari sport